The pyjamas coup was a failed coup d'etat attempt in February 1975 by far-right Greek Army officers sympathetic to the recently deposed (in July 1974) Greek junta. The Greek government, swiftly alerted by Major Ioannis Alexakis, the Security Director of the Central Intelligence Service, arrested the conspirators and subsequently carried out a massive purge of die-hard junta sympathizers in the Armed Forces, especially the Army.

The term "pyjamas coup" was coined by then-Defense Minister Evangelos Averoff, as most of the plotters were arrested at their homes sleeping, on the early morning hours of February 24, 1975. Averoff thus wanted to ridicule the plotters and at the same time reassure Greek public opinion of the government's hold on power.

References

1975 in Greece
History of Greece since 1974
Coup d'état attempts in Europe
Military coups in Greece
1970s coups d'état and coup attempts
Conflicts in 1975
1970s in Greek politics
Konstantinos Karamanlis
Fascism in Greece